Roshdiyeh or Roshdiyeh town or Roshdie is the name of a quarter in northeast Tabriz, Iran. It is famous for its modern architecture. The name derives from Haj-Mirza Hassan Roshdieh, a pioneer of Iranian education.

Photo gallery

References 
 http://www.eachto.ir

External links 
 Virtual Museum of Historical Buildings of Tabriz (School of Architecture, Tabriz Islamic Art University).
 Iranian Student's Tourism & Traveling Agency, ISTTA. (English), (Persian)

Districts of Tabriz